Volume III is the third album of Kamchatka, an eleven track effort, containing the cover version "Whipping Post", originally recorded by The Allman Brothers Band. The album was produced by Kamchatka, recorded and mixed by Tobias Strandvik and Kamchatka at Shrimpmonkey Studios, and mastered by Johan Eckerblad at Mintelligence Studios.

Track listing
  "681" (Andersson)
  "Pathetic" (Öjersson)
  "Astrobucks" (Öjersson, Andersson)
  "Look Over Your Shoulder" (Andersson, Öjersson)
  "See" (Andersson)
  "Wood" (Öjersson)
  "Sorg" (Öjersson)
  "Confessions" (Andersson)
  "Outnumbered" (Öjersson)
  "Guess I'll Be Leaving" (Öjersson)
  "Whipping Post" (Gregg Allman)

Credits

Band
Thomas "Juneor" Andersson - guitar & lead vocals
Roger Öjersson - bass & lead vocals
Tobias Strandvik - drums

Guest appearances
Jean-Paul Gaster - drums on "Whipping Post"
Per Wiberg - keyboards on "Look Over You Shoulder", "See", "Sorg" and "Guess I'll Be Leaving"

Personnel
Johan Eckerblad - mastering
Chris Green - band photo
Hippograffix - cover art layout & design (also Armageddon - Three amongst others)

2009 albums
Kamchatka (band) albums